The 1962 Dallas Texans season was the third and final season of Lamar Hunt's American Football League (AFL) franchise before its relocation to Kansas City from Dallas.

The Texans won their first AFL championship (and only title in Dallas) when they defeated their intrastate rivals, the two-time defending champion Houston Oilers, 20–17 in double overtime—a game which now stands as the second longest game in pro football history and the longest in AFL history.

Coach Hank Stram was named the AFL Coach of the Year and RB Curtis McClinton (Kansas) was named AFL Rookie of the Year.  Haynes became the franchise's first 1,000-yard rusher, concluding the season with 1,049 yards and an AFL-high 13 rushing TDs.

The Texans set an AFL record for completion percentage in a season (60.6%). They led the league in both points scored (389), fewest points allowed (233), and total touchdowns (50; 29 passing, 21 rushing) in 1962.

1962 AFL draft

Schedule

Season summary
The Texans clinched their initial AFL Western Division Championship in November and finished with an 11–3 regular season record. Dallas won the 1962 AFL Championship when K Tommy Brooker connected on a 25-yard field goal during the second overtime of the title game, giving the Texans a 20–17 victory at Houston (12/23).  Spanning an elapsed time of 77:54, the game still stands as the second-longest contest in pro football history as the franchise claimed its first of three AFL titles. The game is the longest in the history of the American Football League.

Preseason

* Special pre-season game site

Regular season

Postseason

Standings

1962 AFL Championship

References

External links
1962 Dallas Texans on Database Football

American Football League championship seasons
1962 Dallas Texans season
Dallas Texans
1962 in sports in Texas